FC Johansen is a Sierra Leonean football club founded in 2004 and is based in the city of Freetown. The club is run by Isha Johansen and her Norwegian husband Arne Birger Johansen.

History
The club started with the objective of giving hope to a group of young people, using sport as a means of channeling their energy into a positive healthy direction. Co-owned by Billionaires CONPROLOG Ltd

In 2010, FC Johansen was not playing the Sierra Leone league. In 2011, they played for the first time in the Sierra Leone division One league. That year they did not lose a single match and were promoted to the Premier division.

2012 was their first year in the Premier League where they finished fourth behind Diamond Stars, Kallon FC and End Lions. 2013, is their 2nd year in the Sierra Leone Premier League.
In February/March 2013, the club had its maiden appearance at the continental level. It played Barack Young Controller FC (Liberian Second Division team) in the CAF Confederation Cup.
FC Johansen lost 1–0 on aggregate and did not progress to the next round.

Performance in CAF competitions
CAF Confederation Cup: 1 appearance
2013 –

References

External links
Team profile - Soccerway.com

Football clubs in Sierra Leone
Association football clubs established in 2004
Sport in Freetown